Euantha litturata is a species of bristle fly in the family Tachinidae.

Distribution
United States, Guatemala, Mexico.

References

Further reading

 
 

Dexiinae
Insects described in 1811
Diptera of North America
Taxa named by Guillaume-Antoine Olivier